Gillian McKercher is a Canadian film director and producer. She is most known for her work on the 2018 film Circle of Steel.

Career 
McKercher produced and directed Circle of Steel, which is a dark comedy about the safety culture of the oil and gas industry. The film was shot in Alberta, Canada, and was one of six productions to receive a government grant. Circle of Steel premiered at the Calgary International Film Festival in September 2018.

See also 
 List of Canadian films of 2018

References 

Living people
Canadian women film directors
Year of birth missing (living people)